ABC 45 may refer to:

 WXLV-TV, a television station licensed to Winston-Salem, North Carolina
 WKDH, a television station licensed to Houston, Mississippi